Edward Drake may refer to:

 Edward Drake (cricketer) (1832–1904), English clergyman and cricketer
 Edward Drake (skier) (born 1986), British alpine skier and ski cross racer
 Edward John Drake, director based in Los Angeles, California
 dward Joseph Drake (1912–1995), English football player, better known as Ted Drake